Myrciaria floribunda, commonly known as cambuizeiro, guavaberry or rumberry, is a species of plant in the family Myrtaceae. It can be found across South and Central America and the West Indies in dry or moist coastal woodlands, up to 300 metres above sea level. The guavaberry, which should not be confused with the guava, is a close relative of camu camu.

Description 

They have red-brown branches and small pink and white flowers. The fruit, which are roughly half the size of cherries, are yellow-orange, dark-red, or purple with tanginess of a guava containing a small amount of translucent flesh surrounding a stone. The fruit has moderate sweetness. The fruit is rich in vitamin C, with the darker colored fruit having higher concentrations.

There is great genetic variability within the species, and Myrciaria floribunda can vary in form, structure and appearance, and that has given rise to a large number of botanical synonyms.

Distribution 
Guavaberry trees can be found growing wild in Central America, South America, Argentina, Belize, Bolivia, Brazil, Colombia, Costa Rica, and many Caribbean islands.  The guavaberry has also been introduced to Florida, Hawaii, Bermuda, Philippines, and Tanzania.

Uses 

Guavaberry is used to make jams and drinks.  Guavaberry liqueur, which is made from rum, is a common Christmas drink on many of the islands, particularly in Sint Maarten and the Virgin Islands. The colonists from Denmark and Holland found it could flavor rum by infusion similar to infused schnapps. In the Dominican Republic it is associated with the eastern town of San Pedro de Macorís which has a large population of Eastern Caribbean descent.

Guavaberry coquito is one of many coquito flavored drinks from Puerto Rico associated with Christmas. The drink is made with spices, guavaberry, milk, sugar, coconut milk, eggs, and rum.

References

floribunda
Berries
Trees of the Caribbean
Trees of Central America
Trees of South America
Crops originating from the Americas
Tropical fruit
Flora of South America
Fruits originating in South America
Fruit trees